This is a list of award winners for the FC Seoul

Club

Domestic Awards

K League Best Team Award

K League Fair Play Team Award

K League Full Stadium Award

K League Achievement award

K League Youth Club Expanding Award

FA Cup Fair Play Team Award

International Awards

Most Organized Club

AFC Champions League Fair Play Award

Individual

Coaching Staff

Domestic Awards

K League Manager of the Year Award

National Football Championship Coaching Staff Award

FA Cup Coaching Staff Award

International Awards

AFC Coach of the Year

Player

Domestic Awards

K League MVP Award

K League Regular Season Top Scorer Award

K League Regular Season Top Assists Award

K League Best XI

K League Rookie of the Year Award

K League 'FAN'tastic Player

K League Best GK Award 

 Best GK Award was finally awarded in 1994 season

K League Fair Player Award 

 Fair Player Award was finally awarded in 1994 season

K League Honorable Mention 

 Honorable Mention  Award was finally awarded in 1994 season

League Cup Top Scorer Award

League Cup Top Assists Award

R League MVP Award

R League Top Scorer Award

National Football Championship MVP Award

National Football Championship Best GK Award

National Football Championship Best 11

FA Cup MVP Award

FA Cup Top Scorer Award

Korea Football Association Fair Play Award

Korean Fair Play Committee Fair Play Award

International Awards

AFC Youth Player of the Year

AFC Champions League Dream Team

FC Seoul 'FAN AWARDS'

See also
 FC Seoul
 FC Seoul records and statistics
 K League MVP Award
 K League Rookie of the Year Award
 K League Top Scorer Award
 K League Top Assistor Award
 K League Manager of the Year Award

References

 Award Winners at K League Official Website

External links
 FC Seoul Official Website 

FC Seoul